Clazakizumab (formerly ALD518 and BMS-945429), an investigational drug, is an aglycosylated, humanized rabbit monoclonal antibody against interleukin-6. Clazakizumab was developed by Bristol Myers Squib and Alder Biopharmaceuticals. A preliminary randomized, double-blind, placebo-controlled, phase 2 dose-ranging study of clazakizumab in psoriatic arthritis patients, funded by the manufacturer, suggested that clazakizumab may be an effective treatment option for musculoskeletal aspects of psoriatic arthritis; however, the antibody lacked a dose-response effect.

See also
 Tocilizumab (Actemra) an anti-IL-6 receptor mAb
 Anti-IL-6, other anti-interleukin-6 agents

References

Bristol Myers Squibb
Antibodies
Experimental drugs